Olivia Niamh Bell (born 12 November 2003) is an English-born cricketer who plays for Scotland.

International career
In September 2022, she names as Scotland's squad for the 2022 ICC Women's T20 World Cup Qualifier. She made her Women's Twenty20 International (WT20I) debut for Scotland, against United Arab Emirates, on 23 September 2022.

In December 2022, Bell was named in the Scotland Under-19 squad for the 2023 ICC Under-19 Women's T20 World Cup.

References

External links
 
 

2003 births
Living people
Scottish women cricketers
Scotland women Twenty20 International cricketers
Cricketers from Cheshire